Alangium griffithii is a species of plant in the Cornaceae family. It is a tree found in Indonesia, Malaysia, Singapore, and Thailand.

References

griffithi
Trees of Malesia
Trees of Thailand
Least concern plants
Taxonomy articles created by Polbot
Taxobox binomials not recognized by IUCN